Channel 30 refers to several television stations:

Argentina 
Channel 30 in Buenos Aires

Canada
The following television stations operate on virtual channel 30 in Canada:
 CFKS-DT in Sherbrooke, Quebec
 CIVO-DT in Gatineau, Quebec

Chile 
Mega in Iquique

México

See also
 Channel 30 virtual TV stations in the United States
For UHF frequencies covering 566-572 MHz:
 Channel 30 TV stations in Canada
 Channel 30 TV stations in Mexico
 Channel 30 digital TV stations in the United States
 Channel 30 low-power TV stations in the United States

30